Pseudomiltemia is a genus of flowering plants belonging to the family Rubiaceae.

Its native range is Southern Mexico.

Species:

Pseudomiltemia davidsonii 
Pseudomiltemia filisepala

References

Rubiaceae
Rubiaceae genera